Marys River is a stream in the U.S. state of Nevada. It is a tributary to the Humboldt River.

Marys River was named by a pioneer citizen after his Native American wife.

References

Rivers of Elko County, Nevada
Rivers of Nevada